The list of inductees into the Pro Football Hall of Fame includes players, coaches, and contributors (e.g., owners and team or league officials) who have "made outstanding contributions to professional football". The "charter" class of seventeen was selected in 1963.

As of 2016, 13 inductees have played for, coached, or contributed to the Buffalo Bills.

According to the Pro Football Hall of Fame, 10 of these men made the major part of their primary contribution to the Buffalo Bills. James Lofton spent a minor portion of his career with the Bills, and two others were assistant coaches.

All Career Highlights listed at the Pro Football Hall of Fame website.

References 

Hall of Fame
 
+Buffalo Bills